This is a list of 182 species in Alluaudomyia, a genus of predaceous midges in the family Ceratopogonidae.

Alluaudomyia species

 Alluaudomyia abdominalis Wirth & Delfinado, 1964 c g
 Alluaudomyia abonnenci Clastrier, 1958 c g
 Alluaudomyia adunca Wirth & Delfinado, 1964 c g
 Alluaudomyia albigena Wirth & Delfinado, 1964 c g
 Alluaudomyia albopicta (Ingram & Macfie, 1922) c
 Alluaudomyia alpina Debenham, 1971 c g
 Alluaudomyia altalocei Delecolle & Rieb, 1989 c g
 Alluaudomyia amazonica Spinelli & Wirth, 1984 c g
 Alluaudomyia angulata Wirth & Delfinado, 1964 c g
 Alluaudomyia annulata Wirth & Delfinado, 1964 c g
 Alluaudomyia annulipes Wirth & Delfinado, 1964 c g
 Alluaudomyia anserina Meillon & Wirth, 1983 c g
 Alluaudomyia appendiculata Debenham, 1971 c g
 Alluaudomyia astera Tokunaga, 1963 c g
 Alluaudomyia aterrivena Tokunaga, 1940 c g
 Alluaudomyia australiensis Debenham, 1971 c g
 Alluaudomyia bella (Coquillett, 1902) i c g
 Alluaudomyia bertrandi Harant & Cellier, 1949 c g
 Alluaudomyia bicornis Debenham, 1971 c g
 Alluaudomyia biestroi Spinelli, 1988 c g
 Alluaudomyia bifasciata Tokunaga, 1963 c g
 Alluaudomyia bifurcata Wirth & Delfinado, 1964 c g
 Alluaudomyia bimaculata Clastrier & Wirth, 1961 c g
 Alluaudomyia bipunctata Tokunaga & Murachi, 1959 c g
 Alluaudomyia bispinula Zhang, Xue, Deng &  Yu, 2004 c g
 Alluaudomyia bohemiae Boorman, 1997 c g
 Alluaudomyia boucheti Clastrier, 1985 c g
 Alluaudomyia brandti Tokunaga, 1963 c g
 Alluaudomyia brevicosta Clastrier, 1960 c g
 Alluaudomyia brevis Wirth & Delfinado, 1964 c g
 Alluaudomyia candidata Yu, 1999 c g
 Alluaudomyia caribbeana Spinelli and Wirth, 1984 i c g
 Alluaudomyia catarinenis Spinelli & Wirth, 1984 c g
 Alluaudomyia claudia Meillon, 1942 c g
 Alluaudomyia cobra Meillon & Wirth, 1987 c g
 Alluaudomyia columinis Liu, Ge & Liu, 1996 c g
 Alluaudomyia congolensis Meillon, 1939 c g
 Alluaudomyia conjucta (Kieffer, 1918) c g
 Alluaudomyia debilipenis Sinha, Mazumdar & Chaudhuri, 2005 c g
 Alluaudomyia dekeyseri Clastrier, 1958 c g
 Alluaudomyia delfinadoae Giles & Wirth, 1984 c g
 Alluaudomyia demeilloni Clastrier & Wirth, 1961 c g
 Alluaudomyia depuncta Remm, 1980 c g
 Alluaudomyia distispinulosa Spinelli & Wirth, 1984 c g
 Alluaudomyia epsteini Giles & Wirth, 1987 c g
 Alluaudomyia estevezae Spinelli & Wirth, 1984 c g
 Alluaudomyia exigua Clastrier, 1985 c g
 Alluaudomyia falcata Meillon & Wirth, 1983 c g
 Alluaudomyia fimbriatinervis Clastrier, 1958 c g
 Alluaudomyia finitima Sinha, Mazumdar & Chaudhuri, 2005 c g
 Alluaudomyia fittkaui Spinelli & Wirth, 1984 c g
 Alluaudomyia flexistyla Chaudhuri & Ghosh, 1981 c g
 Alluaudomyia footei Wirth, 1952 i c g
 Alluaudomyia formosana Okada, 1942 c g
 Alluaudomyia fragilicornis Clastrier, 1958 c g
 Alluaudomyia fragmentum Debenham, 1971 c g
 Alluaudomyia fumosipennis Debenham, 1971 c g
 Alluaudomyia fuscipennis Wirth & Delfinado, 1964 c g
 Alluaudomyia fuscipes Wirth & Delfinado, 1964 c g
 Alluaudomyia fuscitarsis Chaudhuri, Guha & Gupta, 1981 c g
 Alluaudomyia gloriosa Kieffer, 1925 c g
 Alluaudomyia griffithi Wirth & Delfinado, 1964 c g
 Alluaudomyia guarani Spinelli, 1988 c g
 Alluaudomyia halterata Remm, 1993 c g
 Alluaudomyia hirsutipennis Clastrier, 1960 c g
 Alluaudomyia huberti Wirth & Delfinado, 1964 c g
 Alluaudomyia hygropetrica Vaillant, 1954 c g
 Alluaudomyia immaculata Tokunaga, 1963 c g
 Alluaudomyia imparungius Kieffer, 1913 c g
 Alluaudomyia imperfecta (Goetghebuer, 1935) c g
 Alluaudomyia inaequalis Wirth & Delfinado, 1964 c g
 Alluaudomyia inexspectata Clastrier, 1983 c g
 Alluaudomyia infuscata Wirth & Delfinado, 1964 c g
 Alluaudomyia insulana Tokunaga & Murachi, 1959 c g
 Alluaudomyia insulicola Tokunaga & Murachi, 1959 c g
 Alluaudomyia jimmensis Tokunaga, 1963 c g
 Alluaudomyia lactella Remm, 1980 c g
 Alluaudomyia latipennis (Skuse, 1889) c g
 Alluaudomyia leei Spinelli & Wirth, 1984 c g
 Alluaudomyia limosa Clastrier, 1961 g
 Alluaudomyia linosa Clastrier, 1961 c g
 Alluaudomyia ljatifeidae Remm, 1967 c g
 Alluaudomyia louisi Meillon & Wirth, 1981 c g
 Alluaudomyia lunata Meillon & Wirth, 1983 c g
 Alluaudomyia macclurei Wirth & Delfinado, 1964 c g
 Alluaudomyia maculata (Clastrier, 1960) c g
 Alluaudomyia maculipennis (Carter, Ingram & Macfie, 1921) c g
 Alluaudomyia maculithorax (Carter, Ingram & Macfie, 1921) c g
 Alluaudomyia maculosa Meillon, 1936 c g
 Alluaudomyia maculosipennis Tokunaga, 1940 c g
 Alluaudomyia maculosissima Wirth & Delfinado, 1964 c g
 Alluaudomyia magna Wirth & Delfinado, 1964 c g
 Alluaudomyia magoebai Meillon, Meiswinkel & Wirth, 1982 c g
 Alluaudomyia marginalis Wirth & Delfinado, 1964 c g
 Alluaudomyia marmorata (Carter, Ingram & Macfie, 1921) c g
 Alluaudomyia marmorea Clastrier, 1960 c g
 Alluaudomyia mcmillani Clastrier & Wirth, 1961 c g
 Alluaudomyia megaparamera Williams, 1957 i c g
 Alluaudomyia melanesiae Clastrier, 1985 c g
 Alluaudomyia melanosticta (Ingram & Macfie, 1922) c g
 Alluaudomyia meridiana Clastrier, 1978 c g
 Alluaudomyia monopunctata Tokunaga & Murachi, 1959 c g
 Alluaudomyia monosticta (Ingram & Macfie, 1923) c g
 Alluaudomyia mouensis Giles & Wirth, 1987 c g
 Alluaudomyia mynistensis Remm, 1979 c g
 Alluaudomyia natalensis Meillon, 1939 c g
 Alluaudomyia needhami Thomsen, 1935 i c g b
 Alluaudomyia neocaledoniensis Clastrier, 1985 c g
 Alluaudomyia nilogenes (Kieffer, 1924) c g
 Alluaudomyia nubeculosa Spinelli & Wirth, 1984 c g
 Alluaudomyia ocellata Remm, 1980 c g
 Alluaudomyia pacifica Clastrier, 1985 c g
 Alluaudomyia papuae Tokunaga, 1963 c g
 Alluaudomyia parafurcata Wirth & Delfinado, 1964 c g
 Alluaudomyia paraspina Wirth, 1952 i c g b
 Alluaudomyia parva Wirth, 1952 i c g
 Alluaudomyia pentaspila Remm et Glukhova, 1971 c g
 Alluaudomyia personata Debenham, 1971 c g
 Alluaudomyia petersi Tokunaga, 1963 c g
 Alluaudomyia platipyga Tokunaga, 1963 c g
 Alluaudomyia plaumanni Spinelli & Wirth, 1984 c g
 Alluaudomyia poeyi (Garrett, 1925) i
 Alluaudomyia poguei Giles & Wirth, 1987 c g
 Alluaudomyia polyommata Macfie, 1947 c g
 Alluaudomyia prima Clastrier, 1976 g
 Alluaudomyia pseudomaculipennis (Carter, Ingram & Macfie, 1921) c g
 Alluaudomyia pseudomaculithorax Clastrier, 1958 c g
 Alluaudomyia pseudomarginalis Wirth & Delfinado, 1964 c g
 Alluaudomyia punctivenosa Wirth & Grogan, 1988 c g
 Alluaudomyia punctulata Wirth & Delfinado, 1964 c g
 Alluaudomyia puntiradialis Spinelli & Wirth, 1984 c g
 Alluaudomyia quadripunctata (Goetghebuer, 1934) c g
 Alluaudomyia quasivuda Stam, 1964 c g
 Alluaudomyia quinquenebulosa Wirth & Delfinado, 1964 c g
 Alluaudomyia quinquepunctata Tokunaga, 1940 c g
 Alluaudomyia remmi Szadziewski, 1983 c g
 Alluaudomyia reyei Debenham, 1971 c g
 Alluaudomyia riparia Clastrier, 1978 c g
 Alluaudomyia rostrata Zhang, Xue, Deng &  Yu, 2004 c g
 Alluaudomyia rudolfi Meillon & Downes, 1986 c g
 Alluaudomyia sagaensis Tokunaga, 1940 c g
 Alluaudomyia schnacki Spinelli, 1983 c g
 Alluaudomyia senta Meillon, 1936 c g
 Alluaudomyia sexpunctata Spinelli & Wirth, 1984 c g
 Alluaudomyia shogakii Tokunaga, 1960 c g
 Alluaudomyia siebenschwabi Havelka, 1983 c g
 Alluaudomyia similiforceps Clastrier, 1960 c g
 Alluaudomyia simulata Sinha, Mazumdar & Chaudhuri, 2005 c g
 Alluaudomyia smeei Tokunaga, 1963 c g
 Alluaudomyia sophiae Stam, 1964 c g
 Alluaudomyia sordidipennis Clastrier & Wirth, 1961 c g
 Alluaudomyia soutini Meillon & Wirth, 1983 c g
 Alluaudomyia spinellii Wirth & Grogan, 1988 c g
 Alluaudomyia spinosipes Tokunaga, 1962 c g
 Alluaudomyia splendentis Liu, Ge & Liu, 1996 c g
 Alluaudomyia splendida (Winnertz, 1852) c g
 Alluaudomyia sternalis Wirth & Delfinado, 1964 c g
 Alluaudomyia stictipennis Wirth, 1952 i c g
 Alluaudomyia streptomera Remm, 1980 c g
 Alluaudomyia striata Remm, 1993 c g
 Alluaudomyia subannulata Wirth & Delfinado, 1964 c g
 Alluaudomyia tauffiebi Clastrier, 1960 c g
 Alluaudomyia tenuiannulata Spinelli & Wirth, 1984 c g
 Alluaudomyia tenuistylata Tokunaga, 1959 c g
 Alluaudomyia thurmanorum Wirth & Delfinado, 1964 c g
 Alluaudomyia tiberghieni Neveu, 1978 c g
 Alluaudomyia tillierorum Clastrier, 1985 c g
 Alluaudomyia tokunagai Wirth & Delfinado, 1964 c g
 Alluaudomyia transvaalensis Meillon, 1974 c g
 Alluaudomyia tripartita Okada, 1942 c g
 Alluaudomyia tripunctata Spinelli & Wirth, 1984 c g
 Alluaudomyia undecimpunctata Tokunaga, 1940 c g
 Alluaudomyia unguistyla Debenham, 1971 c g
 Alluaudomyia varia Debenham, 1971 c g
 Alluaudomyia variegata Glick and Mullen, 1982 i c g
 Alluaudomyia verecunda Debenham, 1971 c g
 Alluaudomyia vicina Clastrier, 1960 c g
 Alluaudomyia vudu Meillon & Hardy, 1954 c g
 Alluaudomyia wansoni Meillon, 1939 c g
 Alluaudomyia wirthi Williams, 1957 i c g
 Alluaudomyia xanthocoma (Kieffer, 1913) c g
 Alluaudomyia youngi Spinelli & Wirth, 1984 c g

Data sources: i = ITIS, c = Catalogue of Life, g = GBIF, b = Bugguide.net

References

Alluaudomyia
Alluaudomyia
Articles created by Qbugbot